Destination Berlin is the thirty-eighth major release and thirteenth soundtrack album by Tangerine Dream. It is the soundtrack to the 1989 360° movie Destination Berlin. The movie was shown at the premier of the Imagine 360 theater in West Berlin.

Track listing

Personnel
 Edgar Froese
 Paul Haslinger

References

Bertelsmann Music Group albums
1989 soundtrack albums
Film soundtracks
Tangerine Dream soundtracks